Mu'nis, surnamed al-Fahl ("the Stallion") and also known as al-Khazin ("the Treasurer"), to distinguish him from his contemporary Mu'nis al-Khadim, was a senior general of the Abbasid Caliphate in the reigns of al-Mu'tadid, al-Muktafi and al-Muqtadir. 

Under al-Mu'tadid he served as commander of the caliph's personal guard and led various expeditions against Bedouins and other restive elements in Iraq, while al-Muqtafi dispatched him in 906 against the Qarmatians. After al-Muqtafi's death, he played a decisive role in the suppression of the palace coup that briefly deposed al-Muqtadir in favour of Abdallah ibn al-Mu'tazz. He was then named treasurer (khazin) and chief of security (sahib al-shurta) to the Caliph. He died in 914.

Sources
 

9th-century births
914 deaths
Year of birth unknown

Generals of the Abbasid Caliphate